Nadje Noordhuis is an Australian trumpeter, composer and educator based in New York.

Noordhuis is from Sydney, Australia where she attended The Forest High School. She briefly studied sound engineering before moving to Melbourne to study trumpet and improvisation at the Victorian College of the Arts. She then travelled to New York where she completed her master's degree at Manhattan School of Music.

She runs music label Little Mystery Records.

In 2007 Noordhuis was a semi-finalist in the Thelonious Monk International Jazz Trumpet Competition. She was then selected as a Carnegie Hall Young Artist in 2010, where she studied with Dave Douglas.

She has collaborated with Geoffrey Keezer, Maria Schnieder Jazz Orchestra and Arooj Aftab.

As a composer, she has also been commissioned by Sara Caswell, ThoroughBass, ExhAust, the Festival of New Trumpet Music.

Discography

Albums 

She has also featured on albums by Arooj Aftab, the Awakening Orchestra, Zoe Guigueno, Anat Cohen and Darcy James Argue.

References

External links 
 Official website

Australian jazz musicians
Australian trumpeters
Manhattan School of Music alumni
Living people
Year of birth missing (living people)
Australian jazz trumpeters